Events from the year 1952 in Michigan.

Top stories
The Associated Press polled editors of its member newspapers in Michigan and ranked the state's top news stories of 1952 as follows:
 April rioting at Michigan State Prison (295 points)
 November 7 election, including reelection of G. Mennen Williams to a third term as Governor (255 points)
 Visits to Michigan by Presidential candidates, including Dwight D. Eisenhower 
 Eviction from her home of a Lapeer widow, Elizabeth Stevens, arising from efforts by members of a defunct mutual insurance outfit to resist payment of assessments
 National championship for 1952 Michigan State Spartans football team
 The appointment of Michigan men to Eisenhower's cabinet
 Michigan's "drift toward financial chaos"
 Water damage and erosion to Michigan's shorelines
 Hearings held in Detroit by the House Un-American Activities Committee into "the Communist menace" in Michigan
 1952 Detroit Tigers season, including the team's collapse and trades of players

The NFL championship won by the 1952 Detroit Lions ranked 18th in the balloting.  Two no-hitters by Tigers' pitcher Virgil Trucks in 1952 ranked 19th. The Stanley Cup championship won by the 1951–52 Detroit Red Wings season ranked outside the top 20 stories.

Office holders

State office holders 

 Governor of Michigan: G. Mennen Williams (Democrat)
 Lieutenant Governor of Michigan: William C. Vandenberg (Republican)
 Michigan Attorney General: Frank Millard (Republican)
 Michigan Secretary of State: Frederick M. Alger Jr. (Republican)
 Speaker of the Michigan House of Representatives: Victor A. Knox (Republican)
 Chief Justice, Michigan Supreme Court:

Mayors of major cities 

 Mayor of Detroit: Albert Cobo (Republican)
 Mayor of Grand Rapids: Paul G. Goebel
 Mayor of Flint: Paul Lovegrove/Donald W. Riegle Sr.
 Mayor of Saginaw: William R. Hart
 Mayor of Dearborn: Orville L. Hubbard
 Mayor of Lansing: Ralph Crego
 Mayor of Ann Arbor: William E. Brown Jr.

Federal office holders 
 U.S. Senator from Michigan: Homer S. Ferguson (Republican)
 U.S. Senator from Michigan: Blair Moody (Democrat)/Charles E. Potter (Republican)
 House District 1: Thaddeus M. Machrowicz (Democrat)
 House District 2: George Meader (Republican)
 House District 3: Paul W. Shafer (Republican)
 House District 4: Clare Hoffman (Republican)
 House District 5: Gerald Ford (Republican)
 House District 6: William W. Blackney (Republican)
 House District 7: Jesse P. Wolcott (Republican)
 House District 8: Fred L. Crawford (Republican)
 House District 9: Ruth Thompson (Republican)
 House District 10: Roy O. Woodruff (Republican)
 House District 11: Charles E. Potter (Republican)
 House District 12: John B. Bennett (Republican)
 House District 13: George D. O'Brien (Democrat)
 House District 14: Louis C. Rabaut (Democrat)
 House District 15: John Dingell Sr. (Democrat)
 House District 16: John Lesinski Jr. (Democrat)
 House District 17: George Anthony Dondero (Republican)

Population

Sports

Baseball 

 1952 Detroit Tigers season – Under managers Red Rolfe and Fred Hutchinson, the Tigers compiled a 50–104 record and finished in last place in the American League. The team's statistical leaders included Johnny Groth with a .284 batting average, Walt Dropo with 23 home runs and 70 RBIs, Ted Gray with 12 wins, and Hal White with a 3.69 earned run average.
 1952 Michigan Wolverines baseball season – Under head coach Ray Fisher, the Wolverines compiled a 16–7 record and tied for the Big Ten Conference championship. Bruce Haynam was the team captain.

American football 

 1952 Detroit Lions season – Under head coach Buddy Parker, the Lions compiled a 9–3 record, finished in first place in the NFL Western Conference, and defeated the Cleveland Browns in the 1952 NFL Championship Game. The team's statistical leaders included Bobby Layne with 1,999 passing yards, Robert Hoernschemeyer with 457 rushing yards, Cloyce Box with 924 receiving yards and 90 points scored (15 receiving touchdowns).
 1952 Michigan State Spartans football team – Under head coach Biggie Munn, the Spartans compiled a 9–0 record and were ranked No. 1 in the final AP Poll.
 1952 Michigan Wolverines football team – Under head coach Bennie Oosterbaan, the Wolverines finished in a tie for fourth place in the Big Ten Conference with a record of 5–4.
 1952 Central Michigan Chippewas football team – Under head coach Kenneth "Bill" Kelly, the Chippewas compiled a 7–2 record and won the Interstate Intercollegiate Athletic Conference (IIAC) championship.
 1952 Detroit Titans football team – The Titans compiled a 3–6 record under head coach Dutch Clark.
 1952 Michigan State Normal Hurons football team – Under head coach Fred Trosko, the Hurons compiled a 5–3–1 record.
 1952 Western Michigan Broncos football team – Under head coach John Gill, the Broncos compiled a 4–4 record.

Basketball 
 1951–52 Michigan Wolverines men's basketball team – Under head coach Ernie McCoy, the Wolverines compiled a 7–15  record. James Skala was the team's leading scorer with 258 points in 22 games for an average of 11.7 points per game.
 1951–52 Michigan State Spartans men's basketball team – Under head coach Pete Newell, the Spartans compiled a 13–9 record.
 1951–52 Detroit Titans men's basketball team – The Titans compiled a 14–12 record under head coach Bob Calihan.
 1951–52 Western Michigan Broncos men's basketball team – Under head coach William Perigo, the Broncos compiled a 16–8 record.

Ice hockey 

 1951–52 Detroit Red Wings season – Under head coach Tommy Ivan, the Red Wings compiled a 44–14–12 record, finished in first place in the National Hockey League, and defeated the Montreal Canadiens in four games in the 1952 Stanley Cup Finals. Gordie Howe led the team with 47 goals, 39 assists, and 86 points. Ted Lindsay tie for the team lead with 39 assists. The team's goaltender was Terry Sawchuk.
 1951–52 Michigan Wolverines men's ice hockey season – Under head coach Vic Heyliger, the team compiled a 22–4 record and won the 1952 NCAA Division I Men's Ice Hockey Tournament, the Wolverines' second of three consecutive NCAA hockey championships.
 1951–52 Michigan State Spartans men's ice hockey team – Under head coach Amo Bessone, the Spartans compiled a 7–13 record.
 1951–52 Michigan Tech Huskies men's ice hockey team – Under head coach Al Renfrew, Michigan Tech compiled a 2–18 record.

Boat racing 
 Port Huron to Mackinac Boat Race –
 APBA Gold Cup –

Golfing 
 Michigan Open –
 Motor City Open -

Other

Chronology of events

January

February

March

April

May

June

July

August

September

October

November

December

Births 
 February 25 – James A. Barcia, U.S. Congressman (1993–2003), in Bay City, Michigan
 April 10 – Steven Seagal, actor (Under Siege, Hard to Kill, The Glimmer Man) and martial artist, in Lansing, Michigan
 April 16 – Billy West, voice actor, musician, singer and songwriter, in Detroit
 May 15 – Dave Brandon, CEO of Domino's Pizza (1999–2009), University of Michigan athletic director (2010–2014), in Dearborn, Michigan
 June 12 – Spencer Abraham, Governor of Michigan (1995–2001), Secretary of Energy (2001–2005), in East Lansing, Michigan
 July 15 – Terry O'Quinn, actor (Lost, The Stepfather Millennium), in Sault Ste. Marie, Michigan
 August 31 – Kim Kashkashian, Grammy-winning classical violinist, in Detroit
 September 13 – Don Was, musician and record producer who led the funk rock band Was (Not Was), in Detroit
 November 28 – S. Epatha Merkerson, Emmy-winning actress (Law & Order, Chicago Med), in Saginaw, Michigan

Gallery of 1952 births

Deaths 
 January 17 – Walter Briggs Sr., owner of Briggs Manufacturing Company and the Detroit Tigers, at age 74 in Miami Beach, Florida
 March 22 – Tod Rockwell, American football player and coach and sportswriter, at Scott Field, Illinois, at age 52

Gallery of 1952 deaths

See also 
 History of Michigan
 History of Detroit

References